Anamika is a 1973 Indian Hindi-language romantic thriller film directed by Raghunath Jalani. The music was composed by R. D. Burman and lyricist Majrooh Sultanpuri. Songs such as "Bahon Mein Chale Aao", sung by Lata Mangeshkar, "Meri Bheegi Bheegi Si", sung by Kishore Kumar and "Aaj Ki Raat" by Asha Bhosle. The musical instrument duggi was played by Homi Mullan for the song "Bahaon Mein Chale Aao". The film was remade in Telugu in 1977 as Kalpana.

Plot
Devendra Dutt is a famous writer and a misogynist. One night, while returning from a meeting, he sees a young woman thrown out of a moving car. His uncle insists they take her home and get her medical attention. He hesitatingly agrees and takes her to their home.

The next morning, the young woman regains consciousness but is suffering from amnesia. She can't remember anything except that she is married to Devendra. She can't remember anything from her past - not even her name except that she is Mrs. Dutt. Everyone tries to convince her otherwise, but she insists she is in her own home. Seeing her fragile state, Devendra and his uncle decide to let her stay until someone comes for her. They call her Anamika (meaning a woman with no name).

They post an advertisement for her in the newspaper but receive no response. Meanwhile, Devendra slowly grows close to her and secretly wishes that she would stay forever. On his uncle's suggestion, Devendra takes her to Shimla on holiday to further help her fragile recovery. There, he sees Anamika's photo in a studio and on further inquiry discovers that she is the wife of a businessman. Though heartbroken by the realization that she is married, he goes to meet the businessman. Here, he is shocked to learn that Anamika isn't the businessman's wife, but his employee/escort who accompanied him on his holiday to Shimla the previous year. Being already dumped by a former fiancée, Devendra believes that Anamika, like all women, is immoral and after his money and throws her out of his house.

He later meets her at a ceremony where she is introduced to him as Mrs. Kashyap. Confused, Devendra pleads with her to tell him the truth. She finally narrates her past in flashback - an ardent fan of Devendra's novels, she was infatuated with him while in college. However, incessantly pursued by her classmate Naresh, and helpless by her poverty, which is worsened by her mother's ill-health, she finally agrees to the marriage. On her wedding night, she learns that she is married to Naresh's brother, who deserts her the same night believing himself undeserving of Anamika. Naresh now takes advantage of his brother's absence and continues to harass her. She escapes from the house and joins a modeling company. There, her boss tries to take advantage of her and when she resists, he blames her for the incident. She quits her job and Rubai (Helen), who had recommended her to the modeling job, outwardly sympathizes with her and puts her up in what she claims is a working women's hostel. A few days later, Anamika gets arrested with the rest of the girls in a police raid, which is when she realizes she had been staying at a brothel. But she is later released, based on the testimony of the other inmates and her own statement against Rubai. Rubai tries to exact revenge on Anamika for this and sends her goons to kill her. While attempting to escape the goons, Anamika jumps out of a moving car on the night that Devendra finds her. Anamika tells Devendra that when she regained her consciousness and discovered that she was at her favorite author's house, she decided to stay, come what may. After listening to all this, Devendra empathizes and reconciles with her. Just then, a badly burnt  Naresh attacks them both, and after a prolonged cat-and-mouse chase in a darkened house, Naresh gets electrocuted.

Cast
Sanjeev Kumar as Devendra Dutt
Jaya Bhaduri as Anamika Dutt / Kanchan / Archana
Rajesh Behl as Naresh (Main Negative Role)
Iftekhar as Dr. Irshad Hussain
Asrani as Hanuman Singh
A. K. Hangal as Shiv Prasad
Meena T. as Bijli, Maid
Baby Pinki as Dolly
Shivraj as Naresh's Father
Helen as Rubai, Cabaret Dancer
Yunus Parwaiz as Ram Lakhan
Raja Duggal as Photoshop Owner
Achla Sachdev as Archana's Mother
Narendra Nath as Ganga Prasad Malhotra
Siraj Syed as college student secretary

Music
The song "Meri Bheegi Bheegi Si" was listed at #4 on Binaca Geetmala annual list 1973
The song "Bahon Mein Chale Aao" was listed at #36 on Binaca Geetmala annual list 1973

References

External links 
 

1973 films
1970s Hindi-language films
Films scored by R. D. Burman
Hindi films remade in other languages